is a Japanese actress and voice actress represented by Production Baobab.

She is known as the voice of the protagonists in 3 Fujiko Fujio works, Obake no Q-tarō, Ninja Hattori-kun, and Chimpui. As a dub artist she is known for the roles of Jerry (1969-1970) from Tom and Jerry and Bart Simpson from The Simpsons.

Filmography

Anime television
Mach Go-Go-Go (Speed Racer) (1967) (Kurio Mifune (Spritle))
Himitsu no Akko-chan (1969) (Ganmo)
Moomin (1969) (Mii)
Andersen Stories (1971) (Witch)
New Obake no Q-tarō (1971) (Q-tarō)
New Moomin (1972) (Mii)
Anne of Green Gables (1979) (Josie Pye)
Ashita no Joe 2 (1980) (Kinoko)
Game Center Arashi (1982) (Tongarashi Ishino)
Taiyō no Ko Esteban (1982) (Tao)
Mama wa Shōgaku 4 Nensei (Ogin)
Gokudo (1999) (Fortune Telling Baa-san)
Cinderella Boy (2003) (Dorothy Ozu)

Unknown date
Atashin'chi (Old Turtle Lady)
Oishinbo (Tamayo Kurita)
Kaibutsu-kun (1980s) (Nurse Claw)
Kaze no Shōjo Emily (Tom's Grandmother)
Kyōjin no Hoshi (Saburo)
Crayon Shin-chan (Sakurako)
Gundam Wing (Long Shirin)
Chinpui (Chinpui)
Tokyo Mew Mew (Mint's nurse)
Dokonjō Gaeru (Shinpachi Goto)
New Dokonjō Gaeru (Goro)
Doraemon
NTV version (Gachako)
TV Asahi version (Suneo's grandmother)
Ninja Hattori-kun (Kanzō Hattori)
Parasol Henbē (Maruko)
Pink Lady Monogatari: Eikou no Tenshi-tachi (Keiko Masuda/Kei)

Anime film
Hols: Prince of the Sun (1968) (Potom, Phrep)
Makoto-chan (1980) (Monta)
Unico (1981) (Akuma-kun)
Night on the Galactic Railroad (1985) (Zanelli)
Super Mario Bros.: The Great Mission to Rescue Princess Peach! (1986) (Miss Endless, Lakitu)

Unknown date
Ninja Hattori-kun series (Kanzō Hattori)

Video games
Ganbare Goemon (xxxx) (Sasuke)
GeGeGe no Kitaro (2003) (Sunakake Babaa)

Live action
Kaiju Booska (xxxx) (Chamegon (voice))
Ganbare!! Robokon (xxxx) (Robomero (voice))

Dubbing

Live-action
Child's Play (Good Guy Doll (Edan Gross))
Diff'rent Strokes (Arnold (Gary Coleman))
Doubt (Sister Veronica (Alice Drummond))
Everybody Loves Raymond (Marie Barone (Doris Roberts))
Friday the 13th: A New Beginning (Reggie (Shavar Ross))
Supercar (Jimmy Gibson)

Animation
Codename: Kids Next Door (Leona)
Little Lulu (Annie)
The Simpsons (Bart Simpson)
Tom and Jerry (Jerry)
Woody Woodpecker (DVD editions) (Woody Woodpecker)

Awards

References

External links
Official agency profile 

1942 births
Living people
Actresses from Shenyang
Aoyama Gakuin University alumni
Japanese stage actresses
Japanese video game actresses
Japanese voice actresses
Production Baobab voice actors